Justicia alexandri is a rare species of plants in the family Acanthaceae with a very limited area of occupancy. It is endemic to Yemen. Its natural habitat is rocky areas.

References

Endemic flora of Socotra
alexandri
Vulnerable plants
Taxonomy articles created by Polbot